Charles Henry Allsopp, 6th Baron Hindlip (born 5 August 1940), is a British hereditary peer and businessman, a member of the House of Lords from 1993 until 1999.

His main career was in Christie's, the fine arts auction house, in which he was General Manager of Christie's New York and later Chairman of Christie, Manson & Woods and finally of Christie's International.

Biography
The elder son of the fifth Baron Hindlip by his marriage to Cecily Valentine Jane Borwick, daughter of Lieutenant-Colonel Malcolm Borwick, Hindlip was educated at Eton College. He served in the Coldstream Guards from 1959 until 1962, when he joined Christie's. Only three years later he was appointed as General Manager of Christie's New York, where he remained until 1970. Returning to London, he was a director of Christie, Manson & Woods from 1970, Deputy Chairman from 1985 and Chairman from 1986 to 1996, when he took over as Chairman of Christie's International, in which post he stayed until 2002. From 2003 to 2004 he was Deputy Chairman of Agnew's.

Hindlip succeeded his father as the 6th Baron Hindlip in 1993, becoming a member of the House of Lords. His last speech there, on 10 February 1999, was on the subject of droit de suite.

He was a Trustee of the Chatham Historic Dockyard between 1989 and 2000 and is a member of White's and Pratt's.

Marriage and children
Hindlip married Fiona Victoria Jean Atherley (1947–2014), a daughter of Hon. William Johnston McGowan, second son of Harry McGowan, 1st Baron McGowan, on 18 April 1968. They lived at Lydden House, Kings Stag, near Hazelbury Bryan, Dorset. They had four children together:

 Hon. Kirstie Mary Allsopp (born 31 August 1971)
 Hon. Henry William Allsopp (born 8 June 1973), heir apparent to the peerage.
 Hon. Sophia Atherley Allsopp (born 1980)
 Hon. Natasha Fiona Allsopp (born 1986)

Honours
1998: Chevalier of the Legion of Honour (France)

Coat of arms

Notes

External links

1940 births
Living people
Barons in the Peerage of the United Kingdom
Christie's people
Coldstream Guards officers
People educated at Eton College
Place of birth missing (living people)
Hindlip